The Rosemere Historic District is a U.S. historic district located to the west of Lake Formosa in Orlando, Florida. The district is roughly bounded by E. Harvard Street, N. Orange Avenue, Cornell Avenue, and E. Vanderbilt Street.

It was added to the National Register of Historic Places on October 21, 2009.

References

National Register of Historic Places in Orange County, Florida
Historic districts on the National Register of Historic Places in Florida
Geography of Orlando, Florida